Qol Rumzi (also Romanized as Qol Rūmzī; also known as Ghol Roomazi, Qalromezī, Qol Ramzī, Qolrowmezī, Qol Rūmz, and Qurūmizi) is a village in Miyan Ab-e Shomali Rural District, in the Central District of Shushtar County, Khuzestan Province, Iran. At the 2006 census, its population was 528, in 100 families.

References 

Populated places in Shushtar County